Labyrinth is the fourth self-titled studio album by the Italian power metal band Labyrinth, released June 25, 2003 on Century Media Records.

Track listing

 "The Prophet" - 4:46
 "Livin' in a Maze" - 4:38
 "This World" - 4:55
 "Just Soldier (Stay Down)" - 5:27
 "Neverending Rest" - 4:54
 "Terzinato" - 5:50
 "Slave to the Night" - 6:06
 "Synthetic Paradise" - 5:48
 "Hand in Hand" - 4:27
 "When I Will Fly Far" - 5:17
 "The Prophet" (Demo Version) - 5:04 (Japanese Bonus Track)
 "Synthetic Paradise" (Demo Version) - 5:59 (Japanese Bonus Track)

Personnel

Labyrinth 

 Roberto Tiranti - Lyrics, Vocals
 Andrea Cantarelli - Guitars
 Cristiano Bertocchi - Bass
 Andrea De Paoli - Lyrics (Tracks 5 And 10), Keyboards, Programming
 Mattia Stancioiu - Drums

Production 

 Giovanni Spinotti - Recording
 William Novati - Studio Assistant
 Jürgen Lusky - Mastering (House Of Audio Studio, Germany)

Artwork and design 

 Travis Smith - Artwork
 Emmanuel Mathez - Photography

2003 albums
Labyrinth (band) albums
Albums with cover art by Travis Smith (artist)